is a horizontally scrolling shooter developed and published by Konami for the MSX2 and MSX2+ home computers in 1989. It was later re-released for mobile phones on September 1, 2006; for the Nintendo Wii's Virtual Console service on November 24, 2009; on February 19, 2014, for the Wii U; and on July 28, 2015, for the Windows Store (Project EGG). It has never been released outside Japan.

Gameplay 

In the game, the player pilots a starship shaped like a mambo fish. There are only two weapon types available throughout the game, which can be powered up through standard pickups. The weapons gradually lose power unless the player makes additional pickups, but the ship is helped by two stationary "options" similar to those found in the Gradius series. The "options" are able to shift so that they alternatively fire in three directions: forward, backward, and towards the top/bottom of the screen.

Development and release

Reception

Notes

References

External links 

 Space Manbow at GameFAQs
 

1989 video games
D4 Enterprise games
Horizontally scrolling shooters
Japan-exclusive video games
Konami games
Mobile games
MSX2 games
Video games developed in Japan
Video games scored by Michiru Yamane
Video games scored by Tsuyoshi Sekito
Video games scored by Yuji Takenouchi
Virtual Console games
Virtual Console games for Wii U
Windows games